Dorgan (Ó Deargáin) is an Irish surname, derived from dearg "red" (compare Craoibh Dearg). Notable people with the surname include:

Byron Dorgan (born 1942), United States senator from North Dakota
Howard Dorgan (1932–2012), American academic known for his research and writing on religion in Appalachia
Jerry Dorgan (1856–1891), American baseball player
Jim Dorgan (born 1930), Australian rules football player
John L. Dorgan (born 1879), known as Ike Dorgan, American boxing manager, and publicity manager for the Madison Square Garden, founding partner of The Ring magazine
Joseph "Joe" Dorgan (born 1975), American professional wrestler and personal trainer, best known as Johnny Swinger 
Mike Dorgan (1853–1909), American baseball player
Patrick Dorgan, Danish singer
Richard W. Dorgan (1892–1953), American cartoonist
Seán Dorgan (born 1968), Irish politician
Tad Dorgan (1877–1929), American cartoonist
Theo Dorgan (born 1953), Irish poet, writer and lecturer

See also
Dorgon (1612–1650), Qing dynasty regent
Morgan Dangerfield and Donavon Cavanaugh the formidable duo of Veterinary Consultants combine to form what has come to be known as the “Dorgan”